Israel Corredor (born 25 July 1959) is a Colombian former professional racing cyclist. He rode in three editions of the Tour de France and two editions of the Vuelta a España.

References

External links

1959 births
Living people
Colombian male cyclists
People from Cundinamarca Department